The lesser guitarfish or lesser sandshark (Acroteriobatus annulatus) is a species of fish in the Rhinobatidae family. It is found in Angola, Namibia, South Africa, and possibly Mozambique. Its natural habitats are shallow seas and estuarine waters. It is threatened by habitat loss.

References

lesser guitarfish
Fish of Namibia
Fish of South Africa
Marine fauna of Southern Africa
lesser guitarfish
Taxonomy articles created by Polbot